Vapor (or vapour) recovery is the process of collecting the vapors of gasoline and other fuels, so that they do not escape into the atmosphere. This is often done (and sometimes required by law) at filling stations, to reduce noxious and potentially explosive fumes and pollution.

The negative pressure created by a vacuum pump typically located in the fuel dispenser, combined with the pressure in the car's fuel tank caused by the inflow, is usually used to pull in the vapors. They are drawn in through holes in the side of the nozzle and travel along a return path through another hose.

In Australia, vapor recovery has become mandatory in major urban areas. There are two categories - VR1 and VR2. VR1 must be installed at fuel stations that pump less than 500,000 litres annually, VR2 must be installed for larger amounts, or as designated by various EPA bodies.

Other industries
Vapor recovery is also used in the chemical process industry to remove and recover vapors from storage tanks. The vapors are usually either environmentally hazardous, or valuable. The process consists of a closed venting system from the storage tank ullage space to a vapor recovery unit which will recover the vapors for return to the process or destroy them, usually by oxidation.

Vapor recovery units are also becoming commonly used in the oil and gas industry as a means of recovering natural gas vapor and making it a usable and profitable product.

Vapor recovery towers are also used in the oil and gas industry to provide flash gas recovery at near atmospheric pressure without the chance of oxygen ingress at the top of the storage tanks.  The ability to create the vapor flash inside the tower often reduces storage tank emissions to less than six tons per year, exempting the tank battery from Quad O reporting requirements.

See also
 Automobile emissions control
 Onboard refueling vapor recovery

References

External links
 HY-Vapor Recovery Unit from hy-bon.com
 Vapor Recovery Unit from parkenergyservices.com
 Quad O Regulations from EPA.gov (affects the Oil & Gas Industry)
 EPA Gas STAR Program use of vapor recovery to capture methane in oil and gas industry
 Recovery and liquefaction from sd-tankwerk.de
 Use of Vapor Recovery Units and Towers from epa.gov
 Vapor Recovery Unit from promenergostr.ru
 Garo Vapor Recovery Unit from gardnerdenver.com
 Vapour Recovery Units from borsig.de

Gases
Gas technologies
Pollution control technologies